The Company of Strangers (US release title: Strangers in Good Company; French title: Le Fabuleux gang des sept) is a Canadian film, released in 1990. It was directed by Cynthia Scott and was written by Scott, Sally Bochner, David Wilson and Gloria Demers. The film depicts eight women on a bus tour, who are stranded at an isolated cottage when the bus breaks down.

Created in a genre defined as docufiction, semi-documentary/semi-fiction, the film is not tightly scripted. The writers wrote a basic story outline but allowed the eight women to improvise their dialogue. Each of the women, all but one of whom were senior citizens, told stories from her own life. A major theme of the film is how the elderly women each face aging and mortality in their own way, and find the courage together to persevere.

At various points throughout the film, a montage of photos from each woman's life is shown.

Cast
 Alice Diabo as Alice, 74, a Mohawk elder from Kahnawake, Quebec,
 Constance Garneau as Constance, 88, born in the United States and brought to Quebec by her family as a child,
 Winifred Holden as Winnie, 76, an Englishwoman who moved to Montreal after World War II,
 Cissy Meddings as Cissy, 76, who was born in England and moved to Canada in 1981,
 Mary Meigs as Mary, 74, a noted feminist writer and painter and out lesbian,
 Catherine Roche as Catherine, 68, a Roman Catholic nun,
 Michelle Sweeney as Michelle, 27, a jazz singer and the bus trip's tour guide,
 Beth Webber as Beth, 80, who was born in England and moved to Montreal in 1930.

Release

Home media
The DVD was released on December 7, 1999, by First Run Features as Strangers in Good Company. The back of the DVD cover states: "The original Canadian title, "The Company of Strangers" is on the DVD. In every other way it is the exact same film."

Reception

Accolades

The film won the Best Canadian Film award at the Vancouver International Film Festival and the Grand Prize and Interfilm awards at the Mannheim-Heidelberg International Film Festival in 1990.

At the 12th Genie Awards in 1991, Diabo and Meddings were nominated for Best Actress, Holden and Roche were nominated for Best Supporting Actress, and the film was nominated for Best Picture. The film won the Genie Award for Best Film Editing.

Popularity
Mary Meigs wrote a book about her experience in making the film, In the Company of Strangers (1991).

See also
 List of LGBT-related films directed by women
 Docufiction
 List of docufiction films

References

External links 
 
 The Company of Strangers at National Film Board of Canada
  The Company of Strangers at Canadian Women Film Directors Database
 Strangers in Good Company at First Run Features
 

1990 films
1990 documentary films
1990 LGBT-related films
Quebec films
Canadian docufiction films
Canadian LGBT-related films
Canadian road movies
Documentary films about women
Documentary films about old age
Films about buses
Lesbian-related films
National Film Board of Canada films
1990s female buddy films
Canadian independent films
1990 independent films
1990s English-language films
1990s Canadian films